Alex Laing is a former association football goalkeeper who represented New Zealand at international level.

Laing made a solitary official international appearance for New Zealand in a 0–4 loss to Australia on 4 September 1948.

References 

Year of birth missing (living people)
Living people
New Zealand association footballers
New Zealand international footballers
Association football goalkeepers